The National Indigenous Music Awards (NIMA), also known as the NT Indigenous Music Awards from 2004 to 2008, are music awards presented to recognise excellence, innovation and leadership among Aboriginal and Torres Strait Islander musicians in Australia.

History
The inaugural event was held in 2004, launched as the NT Indigenous Music Awards. In 2008 the awards went national and were renamed the National Indigenous Music Awards.

Just a couple of weeks before the scheduled date of the 2021 event on 7 August, it was announced that it would be postponed until later in the year, due to the COVID-19 pandemic flaring in New South Wales.

Description
The National Indigenous Music Awards are awarded during the Darwin Festival and run by MusicNT in association with the Northern Territory Government. They recognise excellence, innovation and leadership among Aboriginal and Torres Strait Islander musicians from throughout Australia. The Awards are presented at a special event in August as part of the Darwin Festival in Darwin, Northern Territory, and feature the best of Indigenous music talent.

Eligibility and categories
To be eligible, the associated release or achievement must have taken place from July (the year prior) to June (the year of the awards).

The categories have changed over the years, but the main categories in the ceremony include Artist/Act of the Year, Album of the Year, Song of the Year, Film clip of the Year and Best New Talent/Emerging Talent, as well as an inductee into the Hall of Fame.

Unearthed NIMAs Competition
Radio station Triple j runs the Unearthed National Indigenous Music Awards Competition to select an emerging Indigenous artist to play at the Awards. Winners have included Dallas Woods, Thelma Plum, Baker Boy, Alice Skye, Kuren, and Tilly Tjala Thomas.

Awards by year
To see the full article for a particular year, please click on the year link.

See also
Deadly Awards (1995–2013)
National Dreamtime Awards (2017–)
Stompen Ground
List of Australian Aboriginal musicians

References

External links

Indigenous Australian music
Australian music awards
Organisations serving Indigenous Australians
Music awards honoring indigenous people
Awards established in 2004
2004 establishments in Australia
Annual events in Australia
Recurring events established in 2004